Ballah or Balla is a village in Assandh tehsil of Karnal district, Haryana, India. The village is located about 22 km from Karnal on a road leading to Assandh, which is deemed State Highway 12. It is also connected to Nissing via a road that leads to Kaithal and Gondar.

Safidon, Gharaunda, Assandh, and Panipat are the nearby cities to Ballah.

References

Villages in Karnal district